Mateusz Słodowy (born 1991) is a Polish professional footballer who plays as a defender for GKS Jastrzębie.

External links

References

1991 births
People from Wodzisław Śląski
Sportspeople from Silesian Voivodeship
Living people
Polish footballers
Poland youth international footballers
Association football midfielders
Odra Wodzisław Śląski players
Kolejarz Stróże players
FK Viktoria Žižkov players
Górnik Zabrze players
Polonia Bytom players
Kotwica Kołobrzeg footballers
GKS Jastrzębie players
Ekstraklasa players
I liga players
II liga players
III liga players
Czech First League players
Polish expatriate footballers
Expatriate footballers in the Czech Republic
Polish expatriate sportspeople in the Czech Republic